Northern Aroostook Regional Airport  is a public airport three miles (5 km) east of the central business district of Frenchville, a town in Aroostook County, Maine, United States. It is owned by the Northern Aroostook Regional Airport Authority.

The airport serves the Madawaska and Fort Kent regions and, to a lesser extent, parts of New Brunswick, Canada.

Although most U.S. airports use the same three-letter location identifier for the FAA and IATA, Northern Aroostook Regional Airport is assigned FVE by the FAA and WFK by the IATA.

Facilities and aircraft 
For the 12-month period ending December 31, 2005, the airport had 1,400 aircraft operations: 59% general aviation and 41% air taxi.

History
The airport once had scheduled air service to Boston and Portland via Presque Isle on Aroostook Airways in the 1970s, and via Northeast Express Regional Airlines operating as Northwest Airlink in the 1980s and 1990s. Commercial service to Portland International Jetport via Augusta State Airport and Northern Maine Regional Airport at Presque Isle on New England Air Transport began in September 2008.

Airlines and destinations
There is no current commercial service. Service ended when New England Air Transport stopped commercial services at the end of 2009, citing the high fuel prices and degrading economy.

References

External links 

Airports in Aroostook County, Maine